The University Hospital Centre (sometimes also Clinical Hospital Centre) in Zagreb, Croatia, is the largest hospital in Croatia and the teaching hospital of the University of Zagreb. It serves most of Central and Northern Croatia for specialist and acute medical procedures.
The average waiting time for outpatient treatment is approximately 5 months and it should be booked in advance either by mail, email or telefax.

The main hospital campus is located in Kišpatićeva street in Maksimir, and is colloquially known as "Rebro". Another major campus is located at Šalata, in immediate vicinity to the School of Medicine, University of Zagreb. Currently the hospital center also operates three other locations - the obstetrics facility at Petrova street, the rehabilitation facility at Božidarevićeva street and the dental department at Gundulićeva street.

The University Hospital Centre Zagreb is a publicly funded teaching hospital providing general and advanced medical care. With over ~1800 beds and 5470 employees It is the largest and most advanced medical facility in Croatia.

The hospital offers gamma knife treatment as well as Proton Beam Therapy treatment centre which makes the hospital among rare such facilities in Europe.

History
The hospital was established in 1942 as the University Hospital Zagreb, when the main site (Rebro) was first built. Other individual hospital locations existed from earlier periods - the first Clinical Hospitals of the University of Zagreb Faculty of Medicine were founded in the 1920s. Current central campus has some 152 000sqm, plans are to move other facilities that are spread across the city on to central location at Rebro, however funding is an issue. Main campus has some 1720 beds, with another 210 beds at Petrova Maternity Hospital and another 180 beds at facility on Salta. As is, University Hospital Zagreb is the largest hospital in Croatia offering total of 2110 beds. Total of 7540 staff work at the hospital, 4570 of whom are medical professionals of this are some 945 medical doctors and specialist that work at the facility.

The hospital underwent major expansion in the early 2000s, when 36 additional operating theatres were added along with the number of other specialist clinics. Currently the hospital consists of 30 clinics and 7 specialized institutes. Since July 2010, the Clinical Hospital, "Jordanovac,” a respiratory disease clinic located near Rebro, is part of the University Hospital Centre.

Hospital expansion plans will see construction of new facilities in near future,  a large multi story garage for up to 650 cars also includes first of 2 Emergency Heliports and a brand new ~28000sqm Orthopaedic Clinic.   Clinics that are currently spread across the city will move to new central campus, this includes Orthopaedic Clinic that is currently located at Salata Campus. Once current expansion are completed central campus will expand to 184000sqm of hospital facilitates and additional 42000 sqm of supporting facilities, such as multi story garages and generator rooms to name few. Noumber of beds will droop to around 1720 beds as comfort for patients will improve as most hospital rooms will now feature maximum of 3 patient beds per hospital room as well as sanitary facilities with each room. Aim of this is to improve hospital care and maintain EU standards in healthcare provisions. 

A brand new 100 000sqm 540 bed General Hospital in Blato will instead act as aa spillway for University Hospital, this will alleviate pressure from current University Hospital and provide another large hospital in Zagreb.

References

External links
 
 http://www.klinika-jordanovac.hr/

Hospital buildings completed in 1953
Hospitals in Croatia
Medical education in Croatia
Teaching hospitals
Buildings and structures in Zagreb
Hospitals established in 1942
1942 establishments in Croatia